Hydrofunk Records is an independent Australian hip hop record label that represents a number of Australian acts including the Resin Dogs and Def Wish Cast.

History
Hydrofunk Records started in 1994 as a series of hip hop events to give local artists an avenue to perform.

In 1995, Hydrofunk founder DJ Katch met Dave Atkins through various live funk, jazz, and hip hop projects. Together they decided to form Hydrofunk Records in response to Brisbane's lack of outlets for underground hip hop.

In 1997 Hydrofunk released its first L.P. with Blunted Stylus's self-titled record. One year later Hydrofunk released Resin Dogs' Grinnin' which received significant airplay on both local and national radio, followed by the Volcanic Lab EP in 1998 which gained the band momentum with touring nationally. This success enabled Hydrofunk Records to secure a label distribution deal with Virgin/EMI in 1999. In 2002, Hydrofunk Records licensed its first overseas label, London's underground hip hop label, Low Life Records with artists like Rodney P, Braintax and Jehst.

In 2007 Hydrofunk created a new label, Hydropunk Records. Its first release on Hydropunk Records is Brisbane band Godnose.

Artists
The following artists are currently or have previously been signed to Hydrofunk Records:
 2 Dogs
 Afro Dizzi Act
 Bankrupt Billionaires
 Blunted Stylus
 BreeChBoy
 Def Wish Cast
 Calski
 Downsyde (now signed to Illusive; previously on Obese Records)
 Godnose
 Good Buddha
 Indigenoise
 Koolism (now signed to Invada Records)
 Omni Anti
 Resin Dogs
 Red Bantoo
 Rhibosome (band disbanded in 2004)
 Skam Artist
 Skin-ki-row 
 Thavy Ear 
 Th3 Numb3rs 
 Triple Nip
 Ugly Duckling

See also
 List of record labels

External links
Official site
Hydrofunk Records Discog @ The Rap Cella
Australia Music Online - 'Hydrofunk Records'
In The Mix Interview with DJ Katch (28 February 2003)

References

Australian hip hop record labels
Record labels established in 1995